Shawan District is a district of the city of Leshan, Sichuan Province, China. Shawan is located on the Dadu River around 40 km (25 mi) southwest from what was then called the city of Jiading (Lu) (Chia-ting (Lu), 嘉定(路)), and now is the central urban area of the prefecture-level city of Leshan in Sichuan Province. It is known as the birth-place of Chinese writer Guo Moruo.

References

Districts of Sichuan
Leshan